Giustenice ( or Giüstexine) is a comune (municipality) in the Province of Savona in the Italian region Liguria, located about  southwest of Genoa and about  southwest of Savona.

Giustenice borders the following municipalities: Bardineto, Magliolo, Pietra Ligure, and Tovo San Giacomo.

Geography

The territory of Giustenice it's located in the Maremola Valley, along Scaincio stream. The highest mountains around the town are  Monte Carmo (1389 meters), Bric Agnellino (1335 m) and Giovo di Giustenice (1200 m).

Giustenice is composed of a lot of small localities: San Lorenzo and San Michele are the most importants, the others are Besso, Vìlla, Vilétta (linked to San Lorenzo) and Costa, Valsorda, Foresto, Pianazzo e Serrati (linked to San Michele).

References

Cities and towns in Liguria